Oyoko is one of the eight clans of the Akans. The name has been used to refer to some towns in Ghana.

Clan
Oyoko (clan)

Towns
Oyoko
Oyoko, Koforidua

Other
 Oyoko Methodist Senior High School